Syntomaula simulatella is a moth in the family Cosmopterigidae. It is found on Borneo, in French Polynesia, Taiwan and Japan.

The wingspan is about 20 mm.

References

Natural History Museum Lepidoptera generic names catalog

Cosmopteriginae